The Tamil Times was an English language British monthly news magazine focusing on Sri Lankan Tamil issues. Founded in 1981, the magazine was published from Sutton and distributed worldwide to the Sri Lankan Tamil diaspora. It ceased publication in 2006.

History
The Tamil Times was founded in 1981 by N. S. Kandiah, S. Navaratnam, P. Ragunathan, P. Rajanayagam, C. J. T. Thamotheram and R. Thayaparan. Thamotheram was managing director of the magazine as well as its editor. The first edition of the paper was published in October 1981. The magazine's publisher, Tamil Times Limited, was incorporated on 10 November 1981. The magazine was later edited by Rajanayagam.

In its early years the magazine supported Sri Lankan Tamil militantism but following the takeover by Kandiah (publisher) and Rajanayagam (editor) in December 1987 the magazine took a moderate editorial stance. S. Arunachalam joined the magazine's board following Thamotheram's resignation.

In its early years the Tamil Times became a crucial source of news about the Sri Lankan Civil War for the growing Sri Lankan Tamil diaspora, particularly as the Sri Lankan government heavily censored local media outlets. The Sri Lankan government published the free-circulation Sri Lankan Times to compete with the Tamil Times.

In the 1990s new news outlets started appearing among the diaspora community. Many of these were controlled or influenced by the militant Liberation Tigers of Tamil Eelam (LTTE) which had a strong presence among the diaspora. The Tamil Times however maintained its independence. The August 1999 issue of Tamil Times was devoted entirely to the assassination of Neelan Tiruchelvam, widely blamed on the LTTE.

With falling circulation the Tamil Times ceased publication in late 2006. Tamil Times Limited was dissolved on 13 August 2008.

References

External links
 

1981 establishments in England
2006 disestablishments in England
Monthly magazines published in the United Kingdom
News magazines published in the United Kingdom
Defunct magazines published in the United Kingdom
Magazines established in 1981
Magazines disestablished in 2006
Sri Lankan Tamil culture
Magazines published in London